Mar–Jana Phillips (born June 15, 1995) is a Filipino–American volleyball athlete.

Personal life
Mar–Jana is the daughter of Bobby, an American and Rowena, a Filipina from Zambales. She has two older brothers, Bobby Jr. and Khi.

Clubs
 Sta. Lucia Lady Realtors (2017–2021)
 Petro Gazz Angels (2022–present)

Awards

Rolling Hills Preparatory
 First-Team All-Harbor League (2008)
 All-Coast League (2008–2012)
 All-California Interscholastic Federation honors (2011–2012)
 Coastal League Player of the Year (2012)
 Member of Power Play Volleyball Club (2008–2012)
 Member of Nfinity Volleyball Club (2008–2012)

Juniata College
 Second-Team All-Landmark Conference (2013)
 Second-Team All-Landmark Conference (2014)
 NCAA Regional All-Tournament Team  selection (2014)
 ASICS All-Tournament team (2014)
 Second-Team All-Landmark Conference (2015)
 Landmark Player of the Week (9/21/2015)
 AVCA Honorable Mention (2016)
 Landmark Conference Second Team (2016)

Individual
 2022 PVL Reinforced Conference "1st Best Middle Blocker"

Clubs
 2022 PVL Reinforced Conference -  Champions, with Petro Gazz Angels

References

External links
 Juniata College Profile

1995 births
Living people
Filipino women's volleyball players
Philippines international volleyball players
American women's volleyball players
American sportspeople of Filipino descent
People from Carson, California